Lillhärdal is a locality situated in Härjedalen Municipality, Jämtland County, Sweden, with 335 inhabitants in 2010. The village is located in the southern parts of Härjedalen, about 5 kilometers from Sveg.

Lillhärdal Church (Lillhärdals kyrka)  is associated with Svegsbygden  parish in the Diocese of Härnösand. It is a wooden church building which was first built in 1407. An extension was made in 1770–1771. The church was originally equipped with rococo decor, including an altarpiece and pulpit from 1774. A wooden church tower was built in 1805.

During the years 1831–32, Göran Sundin (1795-1857)  performed painting and gilding of the stand and drapery painting behind the pulpit. The church underwent restoration in 1880 with a major restoration in 1979.

References

External links
Om Lillhärdal

Populated places in Härjedalen Municipality
Härjedalen